Two submarines of the United States Navy have borne the name USS Ray, named in honor of the ray, a fish characterized by a flat body, large pectoral fins, and a whiplike tail.

  was a  commissioned in 1943 and struck in 1960.
  was a  commissioned in 1967 and struck in 1993.

United States Navy ship names